Ahimsa: Stop to Run is a 2005 Thai comedy-drama film written and directed by Kittikorn Kiasirikun (Leo Kittikorn).

Plot
Ahingsa is a young man who is haunted by his karma, which takes the form of a mysterious red-haired man who dishes out abuse when Ahingsa runs afoul of morality. When Ahingsa was a young boy, a shaman had the mysterious man removed, but the man returns when Ahingsa is a young man and starts taking drugs and getting involved in rave culture. Ahingsa's behavior soon causes trouble for his friends, Ukhoht and Einstein, and a female physician, Dr. Pattaya.

Cast
 Boriwat Yuto as Ahingsa
 Theeradanai Suwannahom as Mysterious Man
 Prinya Ngamwongwarn as Ukhoht
 Ampon Rattanawong as Man with birdcages
 Taranya Sattabusya as Dr. Pattaya
 Johnny Unwa as Einstein

Accolades
The film was Thailand's official entry to the 79th Academy Awards. It was chosen after Invisible Waves had been withdrawn by the Federation of National Film Associations of Thailand.

References

External links
 

2005 films
Thai comedy-drama films
Films about religion
RS Film films
Thai-language films
2000s crime comedy-drama films
2005 comedy films
2005 drama films
Films directed by Kittikorn Liasirikun